The NMBS/SNCB Type 26 was a class of  steam locomotives built between 1945 and 1947.  Originally commissioned as part of an order for 200 DRB Class 52 Kriegslokomotiven placed by the Deutsche Reichsbahn (DRG) with Belgian locomotive manufacturers in 1943, the 100 members of the Type 26 class were completed for the National Railway Company of Belgium (NMBS/SNCB) following the liberation of Belgium late in 1944.

No members of the class have been preserved.  However, the railway preservation organisation TSP-PFT acquired a similar loco in Poland, restored it to resemble its Type 26 counterparts, numbered it 26.101, and now uses it to haul special trains for enthusiasts.

See also

History of rail transport in Belgium
List of SNCB/NMBS classes
Rail transport in Belgium

References

2-10-0 locomotives
Cockerill locomotives

26
Railway locomotives introduced in 1945
Steam locomotives of Belgium
Freight locomotives
Standard gauge locomotives of Belgium